Cribrihabitans marinus is a Gram-negative bacterium from the genus of Cribrihabitans which has been isolated from biofilm from a marine recirculating aquaculture system in Tianjin in China.

References

Rhodobacteraceae
Bacteria described in 2014